Straß in Steiermark is a municipality in the district of Leibnitz in the Austrian state of Styria.

Geography 
Straß in Steiermark is situated in the south of Styria, on the border with Slovenia.

Constituent parts of Straß municipality 
The municipality comprises the communities of:
 Gersdorf an der Mur (393)
 Grassnitzberg (177)
 Lichendorf (506)
 Obegg (37)
 Oberschwarza (156)
 Obervogau (893)
 Spielfeld (683)
 Straß in Steiermark (1571)
 Unterschwarza (214)
 Vogau (1164)
 Weitersfeld an der Mur (555)

Population

References

Cities and towns in Leibnitz District